Tõnu Viik (born 12 July 1968) is an Estonian philosopher. Since 2021 he is the rector of Tallinn University.
He was born in Jõhvi.

In 2003 he finished his doctoral studies at Emory University, USA. Since 1993 he is teaching at Tallinn University.

His philosophical research has dealt with the following topics: philosophy of culture and cultural theory, phenomenology, culture-dependent meaning formation, collective emotions, happiness, love and self-deception.

References

Living people
1968 births
Estonian philosophers
Moscow State University alumni
Emory University alumni
Rectors of universities in Estonia
Academic staff of Tallinn University
People from Jõhvi